Monica Peterson is a Canadian female fencer. At the 2012 Summer Olympics she competed in the Women's foil, defeated 10-15 in the second round.

References

Canadian female fencers
Living people
Olympic fencers of Canada
Fencers at the 2012 Summer Olympics
1984 births
Pan American Games silver medalists for Canada
Pan American Games bronze medalists for Canada
Pan American Games medalists in fencing
Fencers at the 2011 Pan American Games
Medalists at the 2011 Pan American Games